Kim Jung-Hoon (born February 13, 1989) is a South Korean football player who last played for Daejeon Citizen.

References
K-League Player Record - 김정훈 

1989 births
Living people
South Korean footballers
K League 1 players
Daejeon Hana Citizen FC players
Association football forwards